The Australian Building and Construction Commission (ABCC) was an independent, statutory authority of the Australian Government, responsible for promoting understanding and enforcing workplace relations compliance in the Australian building and construction industry. The ABCC was established under the Building and Construction Industry (Improving Productivity) Act 2016 (Cth) (BCIIP Act).

The ABCC existed in a different form as the Office of the Australian Building and Construction Commissioner between 2005 and 2012, and was replaced by Fair Work Building and Construction (FWBC) between 2012 and 2016. In 2015 the Abbott Government attempted to reinstate the ABCC, but the legislation failed to pass the two houses of Parliament. A further attempt to pass the legislation was unsuccessfully made by the Turnbull Government in March 2016. After the two failed attempts to reintroduce the ABCC, in December 2016 Prime Minister Malcolm Turnbull called the double dissolution 2016 federal election. Following the election, the re-elected Turnbull Government was successful in reinstating the ABCC with the vote of Senators Pauline Hanson's One Nation, Nick Xenophon Team and Derryn Hinch.

The Albanese Government transferred the responsibilities of the ABCC that it intended to continue to the Fair Work Ombudsman in November 2022, and passed legislation to formally abolish the ABCC in December 2022. The ABCC, stripped of any continuing function, was gradually wound down ahead of its official abolition on 6 February 2023.

Jurisdiction
Under the BCIIP Act, the ABCC monitored and promoted compliance with a number of laws by "building industry participants", including the BCIIP Act itself, the Fair Work Act 2009 and the Code for the Tendering and Performance of Building Work 2016 (commonly known as the "Building Code"). "Building industry participants" included employees, employers, contractors, unions/employer associations and their officers, delegates & representatives, engaged in the following types of work:
 construction of buildings or structures, ports and railways
 installation of fittings
 preparatory work such as site clearances and laying of foundations
 transport of materials to building sites.

The ABCC did not have jurisdiction over domestic building work (unless part of a multi-site development involving 5 or more houses), or mining work.

Commissioners
The ABCC was headed by the Australian Building and Construction Commissioner. There were only two holders of that office during ABCC's existence:

The initial Commissioner was the previous Director of FWBC, Nigel Hadgkiss, who had been in that role since 21 October 2013. In October 2016, the Construction, Forestry, Maritime, Mining and Energy Union (CFMEU) filed proceedings in the Federal Court of Australia, alleging that while Director of FWBC in 2013, Hadgkiss had allowed misleading material to remain on the FWBC's website about right of entry laws, in breach of a provision of the Fair Work Act (legislation which the FWBC itself used against the CFMEU and other unions). On 13 September 2017, when the case was due to be heard at trial, Hadgkiss formally admitted to the CFMEU's allegation, and he subsequently resigned from the Commissioner's position. Hadgkiss was fined $8,500 for the breach by Justice Berna Collier, the judge remarking that his contravention was "serious" and resulted in "the dissemination by the FWBC – at his direction – of false information to the industry of which the FWBC was not only the regulator, but supposedly a trustworthy source of reliable information for industry participants."

In February 2018, the Turnbull Government appointed former Victorian Chief Examiner (and former AFL umpire) Stephen McBurney as the second ABCC Commissioner.

References

External links
 Website

Defunct Commonwealth Government agencies of Australia
2016 establishments in Australia
Regulatory authorities of Australia
2023 disestablishments in Australia